Quicksand is a board game published in 1989 by Parker Brothers.

Each player controls one of four explorers racing to discover an ancient temple. The object of the game is to be the first player to move their explorer around the board from START to the finish line back at CAMP.

The player pawns represent a mustachioed archetypical British explorer; each pawn consists of a number of parts. To represent the explorer sinking into the quicksand, the pawn's feet are removed, then the waist, and so on until only the pith helmet remains.

A player begins the game with their explorer partially mired in quicksand, based on an initial die roll. Every turn, the explorer moves forward a number of spaces given by height, plus an optional movement die. The explorer can never sink more than hat-deep, and thus cannot be eliminated from the game.

References

External links 

Board games introduced in 1989
Racing board games